Dubi Dam Dam is the debut single by German pop group Banaroo, which was released on 5 June 2005 from their debut album, Banaroo's World (2005).

Formats and track listings
These are the formats and track listings of major single releases of "Dubi Dam Dam."
 Maxi CD
 "Dubi Dam Dam" - 3:35
 "Dubi Dam Dam" (Alien Space Mix) - 5:19
 "Dubi Dam Dam" (Blue Starship Mix) - 5:10
 "Dubi Dam Dam" (Instrumental) - 3:34
 "Make You See The Stars" (Alternative Version) - 3:42

Charts

Weekly charts

Year-end charts

References

External links
 
 
 
 
 

2005 singles
Banaroo songs
Universal Music Group singles
Songs written by Terri Bjerre
Songs written by Thorsten Brötzmann
Songs written by Ivo Moring